United States gubernatorial elections were held on November 5, 2019, in Kentucky and Mississippi, and November 16, 2019, in Louisiana. These elections formed part of the 2019 United States elections. The last regular gubernatorial elections for all three states were in 2015. The Democrats had to defend an incumbent in Louisiana, while the Republicans had to defend an incumbent in Kentucky plus an open seat in Mississippi. Though all three seats up were in typically Republican states, the election cycle became unexpectedly competitive: Kentucky and Louisiana were seen as highly contested races; and Mississippi's race ultimately became closer than usual, despite being seen as favorable for the Republicans.

Democrats were able to hold their seat in Louisiana and flip the governor's seat in Kentucky, while Republicans successfully kept the Mississippi governorship by winning the open seat. As a result, the Democrats gained a net of one seat, bringing the total number of Democratic governors to 24, while Republicans were reduced to 26 governors, continuing a streak of governor's seat gains by Democrats under Republican President Donald Trump that began in 2017.

This is the first time since 2003 in which a party made a net gain of seats in this cycle of governorships, and the first time since 1991 that Kentucky and Louisiana elected candidates of the same party. Democrats also won the total popular vote for gubernatorial elections for the third year in a row, and for the first time since 1991 in this cycle of governorships, albeit by an extremely narrow margin of 320 votes, or 0.01%. Additionally, these are the first gubernatorial elections since 1981 in which all of the margins of victory were under ten points.

Election predictions
Kentucky and Louisiana were seen as the two competitive races in this cycle.

Kentucky governor Matt Bevin had very low approval ratings over issues such as Medicare expansion, pensions, and education. Bevin was the least popular governor in the United States, with only a 33% approval rating, in April 2019. When teachers walked out to protest education funding, Bevin blamed them for child molestation and called them "selfish thugs". Bevin also attempted to roll back the state's Medicare expansion, which would've lead to 500,000 people in the state losing their health insurance, and the measure was deeply unpopular in Kentucky and never passed.

In Louisiana, Democratic incumbent John Bel Edwards was popular in the deep red state, as he had worked across the aisle with a number of issues such as abortion. Edwards also brought Medicaid expansion to the state, a move that garnered praise and was popular. Even though Edwards was popular, the sheer amount of Republicans in the state made the race competitive.

Mississippi, whose governor was term-limited, was one of the most Republican states in the country and hadn't voted a Democrat as governor since 1999, and Republican Tate Reeves was a long serving public servant in the state. However, a formidable campaign by Democrat Jim Hood made the race closer than initially expected. Hood made bringing Medicaid expansion to Mississippi the central issue of his campaign, which resonated with voters in the state as many people want improvements to health care.

Several sites and individuals publish predictions of competitive seats. These predictions look at factors such as the strength of the incumbent (if the incumbent is running for re-election), the strength of the candidates, and the partisan leanings of the state (reflected in part by the state's Cook Partisan Voting Index rating). The predictions assign ratings to each seat, with the rating indicating the predicted advantage that a party has in winning that seat. Most election predictors use "tossup" to indicate that neither party has an advantage, "lean" to indicate that one party has a slight advantage, "likely" or "favored" to indicate that one party has a significant but not insurmountable advantage, and "safe" or "solid" to indicate that one party has a near-certain chance of victory. Some predictions also include a "tilt" rating that indicates that one party has an advantage that is not quite as strong as the "lean" rating would indicate.

Race summary

Results

Margins of victory by state 
States where the margin of victory was under 1%:
 Kentucky, 0.37%

States where the margin of victory was between 1% and 5%:
 Louisiana, 2.66%

States where the margin of victory was between 5% and 10%:
 Mississippi, 5.08%

Red denotes states won by Republicans. Blue denotes states won by Democrats.

Partisan control by state

Kentucky 

The Democratic nominee, Kentucky Attorney General Andy Beshear, defeated Republican incumbent Matt Bevin by a margin of just over 5,000 votes, or 0.37%, making this the closest gubernatorial election in Kentucky since 1899 by votes, and the closest ever by percentage.

Bevin won 97 counties, while Beshear won only 23 counties.  Beshear carried only two of the state's six congressional districts, but those districts were the state's two most urbanized, the Louisville-based 3rd and the Lexington-based 6th.

Bevin conceded on November 14, after a recanvass took place that day that did not materially change the vote count. Libertarian John Hicks also qualified for the ballot and received 2% of the vote. Statewide turnout was just over 42%, much higher than for the 2015 gubernatorial election. The result was a major swing from 2016, when Donald Trump won the state by 30 points and Republicans gained a supermajority in both chambers of the Kentucky General Assembly.

Louisiana 

Incumbent Democratic Governor John Bel Edwards won reelection to a second term, defeating Republican businessman Eddie Rispone. Edwards became the first Louisiana Democrat to secure consecutive terms since Edwin Edwards (no relation to John Bel Edwards) in 1975. It was the closest Louisiana gubernatorial election since 1979.

Under Louisiana's jungle primary system, all candidates appear on the same ballot, regardless of party, and voters may vote for any candidate, regardless of their party affiliation. Because no candidate received an absolute majority of the vote during the primary election on October 12, 2019, a runoff election was held on November 16, 2019, between the top two candidates in the primary, Edwards and Rispone. Louisiana is the only state that has a jungle primary system (California and Washington have a similar top two primary system).

According to the Louisiana Secretary of State more than 384,000 early votes were cast, a significant increase from the 2015 gubernatorial election in which 234,000 early votes were cast.

Mississippi 

Incumbent Governor Phil Bryant was ineligible to run for a third term due to term limits. The Democratic Party nominated incumbent Attorney General Jim Hood, the only Democrat holding statewide office in Mississippi; the Republican Party nominated incumbent Lieutenant Governor Tate Reeves after a runoff.

Situated in the Deep South, Mississippi is one of the most Republican states in the country. No Democrat has been elected to the governorship since Ronnie Musgrove in 1999. However, the state's Democratic Attorney General, Jim Hood, who had held his office since 2004 and had yet to lose a statewide election, put the Republican's winning streak of four elections in a row to the test, as the race became unusually competitive. Reeves defeated Hood in the general election by a margin of 5.1%, making this the closest a Democrat had come to winning a Mississippi gubernatorial election since 1999, where Musgrove won with 49.6% of the vote. Hood flipped the counties of Chickasaw, Lafayette, Madison, Panola, and Warren, which had all voted for Republican Donald Trump in the 2016 United States presidential election.

See also
2019 United States elections
2019 Kentucky elections
2019 Louisiana elections
2019 Mississippi elections

References

External links 

 
November 2019 events in the United States